Druzhba Stadium is a name of several stadiums.

 Druzhba Stadium (Dobrich), a stadium in Dobrich, Bulgaria
 Druzhba Stadium, a stadium in Berehove, Ukraine
 Druzhba Stadium, former name of Ukraina Stadium in Lviv, Ukraine